The Italian polymath Leonardo da Vinci drew his design for an "aerial screw" in the late 1480s, while he was employed as a military engineer by Ludovico Sforza, Duke of Milan from 1494 to 1499.

Da Vinci biographer Walter Isaacson has expressed the belief that it was “devised for a theatrical spectacle”. The "aerial screw" was one of several aerial machines drawn by Leonardo, including an early parachute, an ornithopter and a hang glider.

The pen-and-ink sketch outlines an idea for a flying machine similar to a modern helicopter, with a spiral rotor or "aerial screw" based on a water screw, but intended to push against the fluid of the air instead of water.

The design comprises a large structure, built on a solid circular platform, with a central vertical pole supported by three diagonal members meeting at a small circular plate about half way up the pole. The inner edge of the sail winds clockwise around the pole, while the outer edge of the sail is connected by ropes or wires to a ring that rotates around the lower platform. The design envisions a crew of several people on the wooden platform running around the central pole while holding handles that rotate the sail.

Leonardo's annotations suggest that a linen aerial screw, if turned quickly enough, would push against the air and lift the structure into the air.  The notes indicate that Leonardo built small flying models of the aerial screw, but there were no indications for any provision to stop the reaction against the rotation of the sail from making the craft itself rotate in the opposite direction.  It is conceivable that Leonardo could have constructed small working models, but a full-size working version could not have been realised for want of sufficiently light but strong materials, and a powerful enough drive for the screw. 

In 2022 a drone based on Leonardo's design flew.

References

 Folio83-verso, Manuscrit B, Institut de France
 Machines, Aerial Screw, Manuscript B, Folio 83V (1489), Leonardo3 Museum
 Leonardo da Vinci's helicopter: 15th-century flight of fancy led to modern aeronautics, The Conversation, 3 May 2019 
 Leonardo da Vinci's Aerial Screw, COVE, 22 May 2019 

Helicopters
Leonardo da Vinci